Capital Market Authority or Capital Markets Authority may refer to:

Capital Market Authority (Egypt)
Capital Markets Authority of Kenya
Capital Market Authority (Lebanon)
Capital Market Authority (Oman)
Capital Markets Authority of Saudi Arabia
Capital Markets Authority of Uganda